Notiphila scalaris is a species of shore flies (insects in the family Ephydridae).

Distribution
Canada, United States.

References

Ephydridae
Insects described in 1862
Diptera of North America
Taxa named by Hermann Loew